Joe's Blues may refer to:
Joe's Blues (Johnny Hodges and Wild Bill Davis album), 1965
Joe's Blues (Joe Pass album), 1998